Gaetano Fichera (8 February 1922 – 1 June 1996) was an Italian mathematician, working in mathematical analysis, linear elasticity, partial differential equations and several complex variables. He was born in Acireale, and died in Rome.

Biography 
He was born in Acireale, a town near Catania in Sicily, the elder of the four sons of Giuseppe Fichera and Marianna Abate. His father Giuseppe was a professor of mathematics and influenced the young Gaetano starting his lifelong passion. In his young years he was a talented football player. On 1 February 1943 he was in the Italian Army and during the events of September 1943 he was taken prisoner by the Nazist troops, kept imprisoned in Teramo and then sent to Verona: he succeeded in escaping from there and reached the Italian region of Emilia-Romagna, spending with partisans the last year of war. After the war he was first in Rome and then in Trieste, where he met Matelda Colautti, who became his wife in 1952.

Education and academic career 
After graduating from the liceo classico in only two years, he entered the University of Catania at the age of 16, being there from 1937 to 1939 and studying under Pia Nalli. Then he went to the university of Rome, where in 1941 he earned his laurea with magna cum laude under the direction of Mauro Picone, when he was only 19. He was immediately appointed by Picone as an assistant professor to his chair and as a researcher at the Istituto Nazionale per le Applicazioni del Calcolo, becoming his pupil. After the war he went back to Rome working with Mauro Picone: in 1948 he became "Libero Docente" (free professor) of mathematical analysis and in 1949 he was appointed as full professor at the University of Trieste. From 1956 onward he was full professor at the University of Rome in the chair of mathematical analysis and then at the Istituto Nazionale di Alta Matematica in the chair of higher analysis, succeeding to Luigi Fantappiè. He retired from university teaching in 1992, but was professionally very active until his death in 1996: particularly, as a member of the Accademia Nazionale dei Lincei and first director of the journal Rendiconti Lincei – Matematica e Applicazioni, he succeeded in reviving its reputation.

Honours 
He was member of several academies, notably of the Accademia Nazionale dei Lincei, the Accademia Nazionale delle Scienze detta dei XL and of the Russian Academy of Science.

Teachers 
His lifelong friendship with his teacher Mauro Picone is remembered by him in several occasions. The young, in effect child, Gaetano, was kept by Picone in his arms. From 1939 to 1941 the young Fichera developed his research directly under the supervision of Picone: as he remembers, it was a time of intense work. But also, when he was back from the front in April 1945 he met Picone while he was in Roma in his way back to Sicily, and his advisor was so happy to see him as a father can be seeing its living child. Another mathematician Fichera was influenced by and acknowledged as one of his teachers and inspirators was Pia Nalli: she was an outstanding analyst, teaching for several years at the University of Catania, being his teacher of mathematical analysis from 1937 to 1939. Antonio Signorini and Francesco Severi were two of Fichera's teachers of the Roman period: the first one introduced him and inspired his research in the field of linear elasticity while the second inspired his research in the field he taught him i.e. the theory of analytic functions of several complex variables. Signorini had a strong long-time friendship with Picone: on a wall of the apartment building where they lived, in Via delle Tre Madonne, 18 in Rome, a memorial tablet which commemorates the two friends is placed, as  recalls. The two great mathematicians extended their friendship to the young Fichera, and as a consequence this led to the solution of the Signorini problem and the foundation of the theory of variational inequalities. Fichera's relations with Severi were not as friendly as with Signorini and Picone: nevertheless, Severi, which was one of the most influential Italian mathematicians of the first half of the 20th century, esteemed the young mathematician. Other scientists he had as teachers during the period 1939–1941 were Enrico Bompiani, Leonida Tonelli and Giuseppe Armellini: he remembered them with great respect and admiration, even if he did not share all their opinions and ideas, as  recalls.

Friends 
A complete list of Fichera's friends includes some of the best scientists and mathematicians of the 20th century: Olga Oleinik, Olga Ladyzhenskaya, Israel Gel'fand, Ivan Petrovsky, Vladimir Maz'ya, Nikoloz Muskhelishvili, Ilia Vekua, Richard Courant, Fritz John, Kurt Friedrichs, Peter Lax, Louis Nirenberg, Ronald Rivlin, Hans Lewy, Clifford Truesdell, Edmund Hlawka, Ian Sneddon, Jean Leray, Alexander Weinstein, Alexander Ostrowski, Renato Caccioppoli, Solomon Mikhlin, Paul Naghdi, Marston Morse were among his friends, scientific collaborators and correspondents, just to name a few. He built up such a network of contacts being invited several times to lecture on his research by various universities and research institutions, and also participating to several academic conferences, always upon invitation. This long series of scientific journeys started in 1951, when he went to the USA together with his master and friend Mauro Picone and Bruno de Finetti in order to examine the capabilities and characteristics of the first electronic computers and purchase one for the Istituto Nazionale per le Applicazioni del Calcolo: the machine they advised to purchase was the first computer ever working in Italy. The most complete source about his friends and collaborators is the book  by his wife Matelda: in those reference it is also possible to find a fairly complete description of Gaetano Fichera's scientific journeys.

The close friendship between Angelo Pescarini and Fichera has not his roots in their scientific interests: it is another war story. As  recalls, Gaetano, being escaped from Verona and hidden in a convent in Alfonsine, tried to get in touch with the local group of partisans in order to help the people of that town who had been so helpful with him: they were informed about an assistant professor to the chair of higher analysis in Rome who was trying to reach them. Angelo, which was a student of mathematics at the University of Bologna under Gianfranco Cimmino, a former pupil of Mauro Picone, was charged of the task of testing the truth of Gaetano's assertions, examining him in mathematics: his question was:– "Mi sai dire una condizione sufficiente per scambiare un limite con un integrale (Can you give me a sufficient condition for interchanging limit and integration)?"–. Gaetano quickly answered:– "Non solo ti darò la condizione sufficiente, ma ti darò anche la condizione necessaria e pure per insiemi non-limitati (I can give you not only a sufficient condition, but also a necessary condition, and not only for bounded domains, but also for unbounded domains)"–. In effect, Fichera proved such a theorem in the paper , his latest paper written in while he was in Rome before joining the army: from that moment on he often used to joke saying that good mathematicians can always have a good application, even for saving one's life.

One of his best friends and appreciated scientific collaborator was Olga Arsenievna Oleinik: she cured the redaction of his last posthumous paper , as  recalls. Also, she used to discuss his work with Gaetano, as he did with her: sometimes their discussion become lively, but nothing more, since they were extremely good friends and estimators of each one's work.

Work

Research activity 
He is the author of more than 250 papers and 18 books (monographs and course notes): his work concerns mainly the fields of pure and applied mathematics listed below. A common characteristic to all of his research is the use of the methods of functional analysis to prove existence, uniqueness and approximation theorems for the various problems he studied, and also a high consideration of the analytic problems related to problems in applied mathematics.

Mathematical theory of elasticity
His work in elasticity theory includes the paper , where Fichera proves the "Fichera's maximum principle", his work on variational inequalities. Concerning the Saint-Venant's principle, he was able to prove it using a variational approach and a slight variation of a technique employed by Richard Toupin to study the same problem: in the paper  there is a complete proof of the principle under the hypothesis that the base of the cylinder is a set with piecewise smooth boundary. Also he is known for his researches in the theory of hereditary elasticity: the paper  emphasizes the necessity of analyzing very well the constitutive equations of materials with memory in order to introduce models where an existence and uniqueness theorems can be proved in such a way that the proof does not rely on an implicit choice of the topology of the function space where the problem is studied.

Partial differential equations
He was one of the pioneers in the development of the abstract approach through functional analysis in order to study general boundary value problems for linear partial differential equations proving in the paper  a theorem similar in spirit to the Lax–Milgram theorem. He studied deeply the mixed boundary value problem i.e. a boundary value problem where the boundary has to satisfy a mixed boundary condition: in his first paper on the topic, he proves the first existence theorem for the mixed boundary problem for self-adjoint operators of  variables, while in the paper  he proves the same theorem dropping the hypothesis of self-adjointness.

Calculus of variation

Functional analysis and eigenvalue theory

It is difficult to single out his contributions to functional analysis since, as stated at the beginning of this section, the methods of functional analysis are ubiquitous in his research: however, it is worth to remember paper , where an important existence theorem is proved.

He contributed also to the classical eigenvalue problem for symmetric operators, introducing the method of orthogonal invariants.

Approximation theory
His work in this field is mainly related to the study of systems of functions, possibly being particular solutions of a given partial differential equation or system of such equations, in order to prove their completeness on the boundary of a given domain. The interest of this research is obvious: given such a system of functions, every solution of a boundary value problem can be approximated by an infinite series or Fourier type integral in the topology of a given function space. One of the most famous examples of this kind of theorem is Mergelyan's theorem, which completely solves the problem in the class of holomorphic functions for a compact set in the complex plane. In his paper , Fichera studies this problem for harmonic functions, relaxing the smoothness requirements on the boundary in the already cited work : a survey on his and others' work in this area, including contributions of Mauro Picone, Bernard Malgrange, Felix Browder and a number of other mathematicians, is contained in the paper . Another branch of his studies on approximation theory is strictly tied to complex analysis in one variable, and to the already cited Mergelyan's theorem: he studied the problem of approximating continuous functions on a compact set (and analytic on its interior if this is non-void) of the complex plane by rational functions with prescribed poles, simple or not. The paper  surveys the contribution to the solution of this and related problems by Sergey Mergelyan, Lennart Carleson, Gábor Szegő as well as others, including his own.

Potential theory
His contributions to potential theory are very important.

Measure and integration theory
In the first one he proves that a condition on a sequence of integrable functions previously introduced by Mauro Picone is both necessary and sufficient in order to assure that limit process and the integration process commute, both in bounded and unbounded domains: the theorem is similar in spirit to the dominated convergence theorem, which however only states a sufficient condition. The second paper contains an extension of the Lebesgue's decomposition theorem to finitely additive measures: this extension required him to generalize the Radon–Nikodym derivative, requiring it to be a set function belonging to a given class and minimizing a particular functional.

Complex analysis of functions of one and several variables
He contributed to both the classical topic of complex analysis in one variable and the more recent one of complex analysis in several variables. His contributions to complex analysis in one variable are essentially approximation results, well described in the survey paper . In the field of functions of several complex variables, his contributions were outstanding, but also not generally acknowledged. Precisely, in the paper  he solved the Dirichlet problem for holomorphic function of several variables under the hypothesis that the boundary of the domain  has a Hölder continuous normal vector (i.e. it belongs to the  class) and the Dirichlet boundary condition is a function belonging to the Sobolev space  satisfying the weak form of the tangential Cauchy–Riemann condition, extending a previous result of Francesco Severi: this theorem and the Lewy–Kneser theorem on the local Cauchy problem for holomorphic functions of several variables, laid the foundations of the theory of CR-functions. He also studied the properties of the real part and imaginary part of functions of several complex variables, i.e. pluriharmonic functions: starting from the paper  he gives a trace condition analogous to the tangential Cauchy–Riemann condition for the solvability of the Dirichlet problem for pluriharmonic functions in the paper , and generalizes a theorem of Luigi Amoroso to the complex vector space  for  complex variables in the paper .

Exterior differential forms
His contributions to the theory of exterior differential forms started as a war story: having read a famous memoir of Enrico Betti (where Betti numbers were introduced) just before joining the army, he used this knowledge in order to develop a theory of exterior differential forms while he was kept prisoner in Teramo jail. When he was back in Rome in 1945, he discussed his discovery with Enzo Martinelli, who very tactfully informed him that the idea was already developed by mathematicians Élie Cartan and Georges de Rham. In the first one he introduced -measures, a concept less general than currents but easier to work with: his aim was to clarify the analytic structure of currents and to prove all relevant results of the theory i.e. the three theorems of de Rham and Hodge theorem on harmonic forms in a simpler, more analytic way. In the second one he developed an abstract Hodge theory, following the axiomatic method, proving an abstract form of Hodge theorem.

Numerical analysis
As noted in the "Functional analysis and eigenvalue theory" section, his main direct contribution to the field of numerical analysis is the introduction of the method of orthogonal invariants for the calculus of eigenvalues of symmetric operators: however, as already remarked, it is hard to find something in his works which is not related to applications. His works on partial differential equations and linear elasticity have always a constructive aim: for example, the results of paper , which deals with the asymptotic analysis of the potential, were included in the book  and led to the definition of the Fichera corner problem as a standard benchmark problem for numerical methods.

History of mathematics
his work in this field occupy all the volume . He wrote bibliographical sketches for a number of mathematicians, both teachers, friends and collaborators, including Mauro Picone, Luigi Fantappiè, Pia Nalli, Maria Adelaide Sneider, Renato Caccioppoli, Solomon Mikhlin, Francesco Tricomi, Alexander Weinstein, Aldo Ghizzetti. His historical works contain several observations against the so-called historical revisitation: the meaning of this concept is clearly stated in the paper . He identifies with the word revisitation the analysis of historical facts basing only on modern conceptions and points of view: this kind of analysis differs from the "true" historical one since it is heavily affected by the historian's point of view. The historian applying this kind of methodology to history of mathematics, and more generally to the history of science, emphasizes the sources that have led a field to its modern shape, neglecting the efforts of the pioneers.

Selected publications 
A selection of Gaetano Fichera's works was published respectively by the Unione Matematica Italiana and the Accademia Pontaniana in his "opere scelte"  and in the volume . These two references include most of the papers listed in this section: however, these volumes does not include his monographs and textbooks, as well as several survey papers on various topic pertaining to his fields of research.

Papers

Research papers
. In this article, Fichera proves a necessary and sufficient condition for the exchange of the limit and the integration operations for sequences of functions, in the spirit of Henri Lebesgue's Dominated convergence theorem (which, however states only a sufficient condition).
. A classical paper in potential theory.
. In this paper, Gaetano Fichera gives the first proofs of existence and uniqueness theorems for the mixed boundary value problem involving a general second order selfadjoint elliptic operators in fairly general domains.
. This paper is an important contribution to measure theory: the Radon–Nikodym theorem is extended in order to include singular finitely additive measures in its range of applicability.
. The paper Some recent developments of the theory of boundary value problems for linear partial differential equations details Fichera's approach to a general theory of boundary value problems for linear partial differential equations through a theorem similar in spirit to the Lax–Milgram theorem: as an application, the general existence and uniqueness theorems of previous paper  are proved dropping the hypothesis of self-adjointness of the linear partial differential operators considered.
.
. This is the first paper on the theory of partial differential equations of non-positive characteristics: the Fichera's function is introduced and its applications to the boundary value problems for this class of operators is detailed. Also the well posedness of the problem is considered.
. This is an epoch-making paper in the theory of CR-functions, where the Dirichlet problem for analytic functions of several complex variables is solved for general data.
. "Linear spaces of –measures and differential forms" (English translation of the title) is perhaps the most important contribution of Gaetano Fichera to the theory of exterior differential forms: he introduces the –measures and shows that, despite being less general than currents and thus being easier to work with, they can be used to prove all the most important results of the theory. 
. A paper about the boundary value problem for partial differential equations of non-positive characteristics, where the Fichera's function is introduced and its application are described.
. In this a work, an abstract theory of harmonic forms in Hilbert spaces is presented, and a proof of Hodge theorem is given.
. This is the article where the now called "Fichera maximum principle" is proved.
. A research announcement describing briefly (and without proofs) Gaetano Fichera's solution to the Signorini problem.
.
. In this paper Gaetano Fichera proves a semicontinuity theorem for functionals depending on a general linear operator, not necessarily being a partial differential operator.
, . The encyclopedic entry written by Fichera on existence problems in linear elasticity for the Handbuch der Physik on invitation by Clifford Truesdell.
, . The encyclopedic entry written by Fichera on problems with unilateral constraints (the class of boundary value problems the Signorini problem belongs to) for the Handbuch der Physik on invitation by Clifford Truesdell.
. This is an important paper on the asymptotic analysis of the electric field near the vertex of a conical conducting surface. There exists also a freely consultable Russian translation, .
.
. A work presenting a complete interdisciplinary analysis of the stability of a system of ordinary differential equations containing a large number of parameters, modeling a biological system: the results presented here were later surveyed in the paper .
.
.
. A paper containing a mathematical proof of the Saint-Venant's principle.
. "Having a tenacious memory creates serious problems" (English translation of the title) is a well known work on the fading memory principle and on the consequences implied by its not careful adoption. 
.
. In the work "Boundary value problems for pluriharmonic functions" (English translation of the title) a trace condition for pluriharmonic functions is proved.
.
.
. In this article, Morera's theorem for analytic functions of several complex variables is proved under the sole hypothesis of local integrability for the given function .
.
. Gaetano Fichera last, postumhous scientific paper, prepared for the publication by Olga Arsenievna Oleinik and his wife.
  (vol. 1),  (vol. 2),  (vol. 3). Three volumes collecting the most important mathematical papers of Gaetano Fichera in their original language and typographical form, including a biographical sketch of Olga A. Oleinik

Historical and survey papers
. An ample survey paper on results on the solutions of linear integral and partial differential equation obtained by the research team of Mauro Picone at the Istituto Nazionale per le Applicazioni del Calcolo, by using methods from functional analysis. 
. A survey paper about the theory of approximation of and by analytic functions of a complex variable.
.
. The address of Gaetano Fichera given on the occasion of the conferment of the laurea honoris causa in civil engineering: he describes the history of the theory of elasticity particularly detailing the contributions of Italian mathematicians and engineers.
.
. In the paper "The contributions of Guido Fubini and Francesco Severi to the theory of functions of several complex variables" (English translation of the title), Gaetano Fichera describes the main contributions of the two scientists to the Cauchy and the Dirichlet problem for holomorphic functions of several complex variables, as well as the impact of their work on subsequent researches.
. "The Severi an Severi–Kneser theorems for analytic functions of several complex variables and their further developments" (English translation of the title) is an historical survey paper on the Cauchy and the Dirichlet problem for holomorphic functions of several complex variables, updating the earlier work .
. Some recollections of his close friend Renato Caccioppoli.
. A survey paper describing the development of infinitesimal calculus during the twentieth century and trying to trace possible scenarios for its future evolution.
. Fichera's "last lesson" of the course of higher analysis, given on the occasion of his retirement from university teaching in 1992.
. The birth of the theory of variational inequalities remembered thirty years later (English translation of the title) tell the story of the beginning of the theory of variational inequalities from the point of view of its founder.
. "Revisiting and history: two conflicting aspects of scientific historiography" details its author's opinions about the way of doing historical researches on mathematical topics.
.
. Gaetano Fichera's "Historical, biographical, expository works": a volume collecting his contributions in the original language (English or Italian) to the fields of history of mathematics and scientific expository work.

Monographs and textbooks
: for a review of the book, see .
. A monograph based on the lecture notes, taken by Lucilla Bassotti and Luciano De Vito of a course held by Gaetano Fichera at the INdAM: for a review of the book, see .
. An extensive survey on some results of numerical analysis (especially on numerical calculation of eigenvalues) and associated results of mathematical analysis obtained by Gaetano Fichera and his school: its updated English translation is the book .
. An English updated translation of the memoir .
.

See also
Constitutive equations
Fichera corner problem
Mauro Picone
Potential theory
Saint-Venant's principle
Signorini problem
Variational inequality

Notes

References

Biographical references
. The "Yearbook" of the renowned Italian scientific institution, including an historical sketch of its history, the list of all past and present members as well as a wealth of information about its academic and scientific activities.
. The first part ("Tomo") of an extensive work on the "Accademia di Scienze, Lettere e Arti di Modena", reporting the history of the academy and biographies of members up to the year 2006.
. A commemorative paper written by Cristoforo Cosentini, former member and president of the Accademia di scienze, lettere e belle arti degli Zelanti e dei Dafnici and close friend of Gaetano Fichera.
, prepared by his wife as follow-up to the commemorative paper by Olga Oleinik (1997).
. The biography of Gaetano Fichera written by his wife, Matelda Colautti Fichera. There is also a free electronic edition with a different title: .
. The personal recollection of András Kósa on Gaetano Fichera and Mauro Picone.
. The address of Malaroda at the meeting "Ricordo di Gaetano Fichera" [Remembrance of Gaetano Fichera] held in Rome at the Accademia Nazionale dei Lincei on 8 February 1997.
. This book offers the personal recollections of the Author about the life in his birthplace Alfonsine, during the fascist period up to the end of World War II. He describes various episodes of the life of Gaetano Fichera in his town during wartime, their friendship and the relations between Fichera and the Italian resistance movement. The choice of photographs and the presentation of the book are due to Luciano Lucci, who also cured the web edition which is enriched by several pictures at the expense of the loss of printed edition pagination. The first part of the title, up to the colon, is in Emiliano-Romagnolo while the second part is in Italian.
.
.
.
 is the biographical contribution of Paolo Emilio Ricci in the proceedings of the day dedicated to the memory of Gaetano Fichera (1 June 2011) during the international conference "New Function Spaces in PDEs and Harmonic Analysis", held in Napoli from 31 May to 4 June 2011.
. The biographical and bibliographical entry (updated up to 1976) on Gaetano Fichera, published under the auspices of the Accademia dei Lincei in a book collecting many profiles of its living members up to 1976.
.
.
. The address of Salvini at the meeting "Ricordo di Gaetano Fichera" [Remembrance of Gaetano Fichera] held in Rome at the Accademia Nazionale dei Lincei on 8 February 1997.
. A detailed and carefully commented regest of all the documents of the official archive of the Sapienza University of Rome pertaining to the honoris causa degrees, awarded or not. It includes all the awarding proposals submitted during the considered period, detailed presentations of the work of the candidate, if available, and precise references to related articles published on Italian newspapers and magazines, if the laurea was awarded. 
. A detailed and carefully commented regest of all the documents of the official archive of the Sapienza University of Rome pertaining to the honoris causa degrees, awarded or not. It includes all the awarding proposals submitted during the considered period, detailed presentations of the work of the candidate, if available, and precise references to related articles published on Italian newspapers and magazines, if the laurea was awarded. 
. A detailed and carefully commented regest of all the documents of the official archive of the Sapienza University of Rome pertaining to the honoris causa degrees, awarded or not. It includes all the awarding proposals submitted during the considered period, detailed presentations of the work of the candidate, if available, and precise references to related articles published on Italian newspapers and magazines, if the laurea was awarded. 
. A detailed and carefully commented regest of all the documents of the official archive of the Sapienza University of Rome pertaining to the honoris causa degrees, awarded or not. It includes all the awarding proposals submitted during the considered period, detailed presentations of the work of the candidate, if available, and precise references to related articles published on Italian newspapers and magazines, if the laurea was awarded. 
. Some recollections of the author about Gaetano Fichera.

General references
. The address of Amerio at the meeting "Ricordo di Gaetano Fichera" (Remembrance of Gaetano Fichera) held in Rome at the Accademia Nazionale dei Lincei on 8 February 1997.
. The address of Baiocchi at the meeting "Ricordo di Gaetano Fichera" (Remembrance of Gaetano Fichera) held in Rome at the Accademia Nazionale dei Lincei on 8 February 1997.
. The biographical contribution of Paolo de Lucia in the proceedings of the day dedicated to the memory of Gaetano Fichera (1 June 2011) during the international conference "New Function Spaces in PDEs and Harmonic Analysis", held in Napoli from 31 May to 4 June 2011.
, available from the Accademia delle Scienze di Torino, is a commemoration of Gaetano Fichera written by one of the former students of Mauro Picone, and colleague of Fichera at the Turin Academia. 
: the recollections of a friend and early colleague at the Istituto Nazionale per le Applicazioni del Calcolo.
. The address of Grioli at the meeting "Ricordo di Gaetano Fichera" ("Remembrance of Gaetano Fichera") held in Rome at the Accademia Nazionale dei Lincei on 8 February 1997.
. 
. Some vivid recollection of Fichera by Vladimir Maz'ya.
. The contribution of Vladimir Maz'ya in the proceedings of the day dedicated to the memory of Gaetano Fichera (1 June 2011) during the international conference "New Function Spaces in PDEs and Harmonic Analysis", held in Napoli from 31 May to 4 June 2011, similar to his earlier commemorative paper .
.
.
.
. The biographical sketch of Fichera by Olga Oleinik at the meeting "Ricordo di Gaetano Fichera" ("Remembrance of Gaetano Fichera") held in Rome at the Accademia Nazionale dei Lincei on 8 February 1997. The same paper is also included in the first volume of the selected works of Gaetano Fichera (2004) and in the volume of his historical, biographical, and expository works (2002).
. "Remembrance of Prof. G. Fichera" is the contribution of Salvatore Rionero in the proceedings of the day dedicated to the memory of Gaetano Fichera (1 June 2011) during the international conference "New Function Spaces in PDEs and Harmonic Analysis", held in Napoli from 31 May to 4 June 2011. It includes the transparencies of the contribution (written in English) "Asymptotic Behaviour of Solutions of Evolution Problems" by Fichera to the international conference "Waves and Stability in Continuous Media", held in Palermo from 9 to 14 October 1995.
. The "Introduction" to the proceedings of the day dedicated to the memory of Gaetano Fichera (1 June 2011) during the international conference "New Function Spaces in PDEs and Harmonic Analysis", held in Napoli from 31 May to 4 June 2011, by its editor, giving a few biographical remarks.
. The address of Vesentini at the meeting "Ricordo di Gaetano Fichera" (Remembrance of Gaetano Fichera) held in Rome at the Accademia Nazionale dei Lincei on 8 February 1997.
. A biographical work focusing on the contributions of Gaetano Fichera to mechanics and the role played by him in the founding of the ISIMM.

Scientific references
. The first paper where a set of (fairly complicate) necessary and sufficient conditions for the solvability of the Dirichlet problem for holomorphic functions of several variables is given: the bounded domain where the problem is posed and solved is assumed to be not pseudoconvex.
. A historical paper about the fruitful interaction of elasticity theory and mathematical analysis: the creation of the theory of variational inequalities by Fichera is described in paragraph 5, pages 282–284.
.
. A definitive monograph on integration and measure theory: the treatment of the limiting behavior of the integral of various kind of sequences of measure-related structures (measurable functions, measurable sets, measures and their combinations) is somewhat conclusive.
. The contribution of Alberto Cialdea read in the day dedicated to the memory of Gaetano Fichera (1 June 2011) of the international conference "New Function Spaces in PDEs and Harmonic Analysis", held in Napoli from 31 May to 4 June 2011.
. A survey of Gaetano Fichera's contributions to the theory of partial differential equations, written by two of his pupils.
.
.
. An historical paper correcting some inexact historical statements in the theory of holomorphic functions of several variables, particularly concerning contributions of Gaetano Fichera and Francesco Severi.
. An historical paper exploring further the same topic previously dealt in the paper  by the same author.
, available at Gallica.
. A book arose from the notes of a course held by Francesco Severi at the Istituto Nazionale di Alta Matematica (which at present is named after him), containing appendices of Enzo Martinelli, Giovanni Battista Rizza and Mario Benedicty.
. 
. (preprint version available from the author's website retrieved on 1 May 2009). An expository paper detailing the contributions of Gaetano Fichera and his school on the problem of numerical calculation of eigenvalues for general differential operators.

Publications dedicated to him or to his memory
. A volume of the mathematical journal published by the Mathematics Department of the University of Catania, containing a selection of papers presented to a periodic conference dedicated to Gaetano Fichera.
. The proceedings of a conference dedicated to Gaetano Fichera and its contributions to mathematical analysis and continuum mechanics, held at the Accademia Nazionale dei Lincei.
. A volume of the journal dedicated to Gaetano Fichera, including survey papers describing his research contributions to mathematical analysis and research papers on topics investigated by him.
. A volume of the journal dedicated to Gaetano Fichera on the occasion of his 85th birthday anniversary: it "contains contributions by several scientists outside Italy, who knew Fichera personally, either through working with him, or through his work", as remarked by the editors on page VII.
. Published by the A. Razmadze Mathematical Institute of the Georgian National Academy of Sciences.
.
.
. The proceedings of the day dedicated to the memory of Gaetano Fichera (1 June 2011) during the international conference "New Function Spaces in PDEs and Harmonic Analysis", held in Napoli from 31 May to 4 June 2011.

External links 

. The biographical entry about Gaetano Fichera at the Enciclopedia Treccani.

1922 births
1996 deaths
People from Acireale
20th-century Italian mathematicians
Complex analysts
Italian historians of mathematics
Foreign Members of the USSR Academy of Sciences
Members of the Lincean Academy
Sapienza University of Rome alumni
Academic staff of the Sapienza University of Rome
Academic staff of the University of Trieste
Mathematical analysts
Mathematical physicists
PDE theorists
Mathematicians from Sicily
20th-century Italian historians